The R244 road is a short regional road in Ireland, located in County Donegal.

References

Regional roads in the Republic of Ireland
Roads in County Donegal